Željko Milinovič (born 12 October 1969) is a Slovenian former professional footballer who played as a defender. He represented his country at the two major tournaments for which they qualified, the Euro 2000 and the World Cup 2002.

Club career
Born in Ljubljana, Milinovič began his football career with local side Slovan. After half of the 1991–92 season he moved to Olimpija Ljubljana, where he won three consecutive Slovenian Championships and one Slovenian Cup. After a season at Ljubljana, he moved to Maribor. There, he won two consecutive Slovenian Championships and one Slovenian Cup. He had a few successful spells abroad, namely in Austria (LASK Linz and Grazer AK) and Japan (JEF United Ichihara).

International career
Milinovič was capped 38 times and scored three goals for Slovenia. He was a participant at the Euro 2000 and World Cup 2002.

Career statistics

Club

International

International goals
Scores and results list Slovenia's goal tally first.

Honours
Olimpija
Slovenian PrvaLiga: 1991–92, 1992–93, 1993–94
Slovenian Cup: 1992–93

Maribor
Slovenian PrvaLiga: 1996–97, 1997–98
Slovenian Cup: 1996–97

LASK
Austrian Cup: runner-up 1999–2000

See also
Slovenian international players
NK Maribor players

References

External links

 Player profile at PrvaLiga 
 Player profile at NZS 

1969 births
Living people
Footballers from Ljubljana
Slovenian footballers
Association football defenders
Slovenian expatriate footballers
Slovenian expatriate sportspeople in Austria
LASK players
Slovenian PrvaLiga players
NK Olimpija Ljubljana (1945–2005) players
NK Ljubljana players
NK Maribor players
NK Olimpija Ljubljana (2005) players
JEF United Chiba players
J1 League players
Expatriate footballers in Japan
Austrian Football Bundesliga players
Expatriate footballers in Austria
UEFA Euro 2000 players
2002 FIFA World Cup players
Slovenia international footballers